Bobak is a given name and a surname. It is a Persian male given name and a variant of Babak, which is derived from the Old Persian , meaning 'young father'.  In Polish, Bobak  is a surname, derived from the Slavic word , meaning "bean" or "broad bean". The name may refer to:

Given name
Bobak Ferdowsi (born 1979), American systems engineer
Bobak Kianoush (born 1978), British musician

Surname
Bruno Bobak (1923–2012), Canadian artist
Celia Bobak, set decorator and art director
Jacqueline Bobak (born 1962), American musician
Katherine Bobak (born 1994), Canadian pair skater
Molly Bobak (1922–2014), Canadian artist and writer
Przemysław Bobak (born 1974), Polish diplomat
Stanisław Bobak (1956–2010), Polish ski jumper

See also
 
Babak (disambiguation)

References

Persian masculine given names
Polish-language surnames